Nina Bergsvik (born July 21, 1973 in Bergen) is a Norwegian sprint canoer who competed in the early 1990s. She was eliminated in the semifinals of the K-4 500 m event at the 1992 Summer Olympics in Barcelona.

References
 Sports-Reference.com profile

1973 births
Canoeists at the 1992 Summer Olympics
Living people
Norwegian female canoeists
Olympic canoeists of Norway
Sportspeople from Bergen